Camp Lawton may refer to:

 Camp Lawton (Georgia), an 1864 Confederate States of America prisoner of war camp located in Lawtonville, Georgia
Camp Lawton (Gettysburg Battlefield), the Gettysburg Battlefield camps after the American Civil War in Pennsylvania
Camp Lawton (BSA) a Boy Scout Camp in Arizona

See also
Fort Lawton, a former United States Army post in Seattle, Washington